, prov. designation: , is a resonant trans-Neptunian object of the plutino population in the Kuiper belt, located in the outermost region of the Solar System. It was discovered on 8 October 1996, by American astronomers Jun Chen, David Jewitt, Chad Trujillo and Jane Luu, using the UH88 telescope at the Mauna Kea Observatories, Hawaii. , it has not been named.

Orbit and classification 

 orbits the Sun at a distance of 34.5–44.2 AU once every 247 years and 1 month (90,254 days; semi-major axis of 39.38 AU). Its orbit has an eccentricity of 0.12 and an inclination of 15° with respect to the ecliptic. The body's observation arc begins with its official discovery observation at the Mauna Kea Observatories on 8 October 1996. It came to perihelion in 1998. , it is at 35.6 AU from the Sun and has an apparent magnitude of 22.85. 

 is a trans-Neptunian object and belongs to the plutino population, a large group of objects named after their largest member, Pluto. These resonant trans-Neptunian objects stay in a 2:3 mean-motion orbital resonance with Neptune, orbiting exactly two times the Sun for every three orbits Neptune does and are therefore protected from the planets scattering effect. Plutinos form in inner rim of the Kuiper belt, a circumstellar disc of mostly non-resonant classical Kuiper belt objects.

Numbering and naming 

This minor planet was numbered by the Minor Planet Center on 16 November 2005, receiving the number  in the minor planet catalog. , it has not been named. According to the established naming conventions, it will be given a mythological name associated with the underworld.

Physical characteristics 

A red surface color is typically associated with the presence of tholins, polymer-like organic compounds, formed by long exposures to solar and cosmic radiation.

Rotation period 

In 1999, results of a photometric survey of Kuiper belt objects by Romanishin and Tegler were published in the Journal Nature. For , a brightness variation of no more than 0.22 in magnitude could be determined, which is indicative of a modestly irregular shape. , no rotational lightcurve for this object has been obtained from photometry. The body's rotation period, pole and actual shape remain unknown.

Diameter and albedo 

References

External links 
 MPEC 1997-N20 : 1996 TQ66, Minor Planet Electronic Circular
  (118228) 1996 TQ66, Small Bodies Data Ferret
 Kuiper Belt Object Magnitudes and Surface Colors, Stephen C. Tegler (archived)
 List of Transneptunian Objects, Minor Planet Center
 Discovery Circumstances: Numbered Minor Planets (115001)–(120000), Minor Planet Center
 
 

118228
Discoveries by Chad Trujillo
118228
118228
118228
19961008